Middle East respiratory syndrome outbreak (MERS outbreak) may refer to:

 2012 Middle East respiratory syndrome outbreak (2012 MERS outbreak)
 2015 Middle East respiratory syndrome outbreak in South Korea (2015 MERS outbreak)
 2018 Middle East respiratory syndrome outbreak (2018 MERS outbreak)

See also
MERS, Middle East respiratory syndrome, a disease
Middle East respiratory syndrome–related coronavirus, the virus that causes the disease
Severe acute respiratory syndrome outbreak (disambiguation)

Outbreaks
2012 disease outbreaks
2015 disease outbreaks
2018 disease outbreaks